Emily Martin may refer to:

 Emily Martin (1884–1962), aka Emily Dutton, South Australian musician and socialite
 Emily Martin (anthropologist) (born 1944), sinologist, anthropologist, and feminist
 Emily Martin (rower) (born 1979), Australian rower
 Emily Martin (diver), British diver
 Emily Winfield Martin, American artist and author-illustrator of children's books